The Hammond Pros were an American football team from Hammond, Indiana that played in the National Football League from 1920 to 1926 as a traveling team.

History
The Pros were established by local businessman Paul Parduhn and Dr. Alva Young. Young, a boxing promoter and owner of a racing stable, also served as doctor/trainer (and part-owner) for a semi-pro football team operated by the Hammond Clabby Athletic Association from 1915 to 1917. In 1918, Young presided over a new team known as the "Hammond All-Stars" and played against many of the teams that would form the backbone of the American Professional Football Association (including the Racine Cardinals, Detroit Heralds, Rock Island Independents, Minneapolis Marines, Cleveland Tigers, Canton Bulldogs, and Toledo Maroons); Young attended the historic meeting in Canton, Ohio at which the APFA was formed in 1920. (It is said that a game between Hammond and Canton, played Thanksgiving Day 1919 and drawing some 12,000 spectators in Chicago, convinced team owners that a league would be viable.)

In 1919, the team starred George Halas at wide receiver; Halas left for the Decatur Staleys – the future Chicago Bears – the following year, remaining with that franchise as a player, coach and owner until his death in 1983.

Despite the name, the Pros were little more than a semi-professional outfit; most of the players were locals who had full-time jobs and couldn't practice much, and thus were simply no match for most other NFL squads. Nor did they really represent Hammond, as the town's stadium (A. Murray Turner Field) was built for baseball and seated only a few thousand. The Pros would play only two regular-season NFL games in Hammond over their seven years in the league, and would use Cubs Park in Chicago as an unofficial "home" stadium. Nevertheless, Young kept the team going in the NFL for seven years and 34 games, with a combined record of 5–26–4. The Pros might have lasted even longer, but after winning the 1926 battle with the American Football League, the NFL decided to scale down to 12 teams, getting rid of many of the smaller franchises, including the Pros.

Of the nine African-American players in the league during those years, six played for the Pros, including the first African-American head coach in the NFL, Fritz Pollard, and the successful music producer Mayo Williams.

Hall of Famers

Season-by-season

References

External links
More info on the Hammond Pros

 
American football teams established in 1920
American football teams disestablished in 1926
Defunct National Football League teams
Defunct American football teams in Indiana
1920 establishments in Indiana
1926 disestablishments in Indiana
Hammond, Indiana